Andrea Morris (born July 10, 1983) is a Canadian actress. She plays the role of quiet, shy, homeless girl Margaret on 7th Heaven. Her character was first introduced in the Season 11 episode "The Replacements", whom the Camdens eventually decide to take in.

Morris is a science and technology journalist, ongoing contributor to Forbes, and author of the book "The Science of On-Camera Acting" in collaboration with Dr. Paul Ekman which documents a neuroscientific perspective on how audiences perceive human emotion and expression filtered through the lens of a camera.
 
Morris produces semi-scripted comedies and science-based content for various television networks including Lifetime Network and is a senior producer of U.S. content for MBC Network television documentary series Moment showcasing global achievements in science and tech to inspire the next generation of women and men in the Middle East towards fields in STEM (Science, Technology, Engineering, and Math).

References

External links
 
 "The Science of On-Camera Acting" by Andréa Morris, Dr. Paul Ekman (Commentary) on Amazon.com

1983 births
Living people
Actresses from Toronto
Canadian child actresses
Canadian television actresses